Monte Fitz Roy (also known as Cerro Chaltén, Cerro Fitz Roy, or simply Mount Fitz Roy) is a mountain in Patagonia, on the border between Argentina and Chile.  It is located in the Southern Patagonian Ice Field, near El Chaltén village and Viedma Lake. It was first climbed in 1952 by French alpinists Lionel Terray and Guido Magnone.

European discovery
The first Europeans recorded as seeing Mount Fitz Roy were the Spanish explorer Antonio de Viedma and his companions, who reached the shores of Viedma Lake in 1783.

Cerro is a Spanish word meaning ridge or hill, while Chaltén comes from a Tehuelche (Aonikenk) word meaning "smoking mountain", because a cloud usually forms around the mountain's peak. Fitz Roy is one of several peaks the Tehuelche called Chaltén.

Geography
Argentina and Chile have agreed that their international border detours eastwards to pass over the main summit, but a large part of the border to the south of the summit, as far as Cerro Murallón, remains undefined. The mountain is the symbol of the Argentine Santa Cruz Province, which includes its representation on its flag and its coat of arms.

Nevertheless, most of the summit remains in uncontested Argentinian territory, including its famous peak -which is inaccessible from the Chilean side- and even enjoying its sight remains -in practical terms- pretty much restricted to the Eastern slopes of the Andes.

Notable ascents

 1952, Lionel Terray and Guido Magnone via Southeast Ridge (Franco-Argentine Ridge) (first ascent - 2 February 1952)
 1965, Carlos Comesaña and José Luis Fonrouge (from Argentina) via Supercanaleta (1,600m, TD+ 5.10 90deg) in  days (second ascent)
 1968, Southwest Ridge aka The Californian Route (third ascent). Ascent by the "Fun Hogs": Yvon Chouinard (who went on to found outdoor clothing and equipment company Patagonia and climbing equipment company Black Diamond Equipment), Dick Dorworth, Chris Jones, Lito Tejada-Flores (filmmaker, whose 16mm Bolex camera footage of the ascent was used for the film of the expedition entitled Mountain of Storms) and Douglas Tompkins (who, in 1964, had co-founded outdoor equipment and clothing company The North Face).
 1972, Southeast Ridge (fourth ascent). Ian Wade (U.S.), Dave Nicol (UK), Mo Anthoine (UK), Guy Lee (UK), Larry Derby (U.S.) & Eddie Birch (UK).
 1980, following the Col Americano route, Gino Casassa (Chile, monitor of the Andinism Federation of Chile) and Walter Bertsch (Austria) arrived at the peak together. Alejandro Izquierdo (Chilean) climbed to 2,800 m.
 1984, Franco Argentina Route by Marcos Couch, Eduardo Brenner, Alberto Bendinger, and Pedro Friedrich.
 1986, First winter ascent, in July, by Argentines Eduardo Brenner, Sebastián De La Cruz and Gabriel Ruiz, over three days via Supercanaleta.
 1990, First winter solo ascent, in July, by Yasushi Yamanoi.
 2002, Dean Potter, first free solo, via Supercanaleta
 2009, Colin Haley, solo via Supercanaleta
 2009, Matthew McCarron, solo via The Californian Route 
 2014, Between 12 and 16 February, Tommy Caldwell and Alex Honnold completed the first ascent of the much discussed "Fitz Traverse", climbing across the iconic ridge line of Fitz Roy and its satellite peaks. The route is 5 kilometers long and has approximately 4,000 meters of vertical elevation, with routes ranging in difficulty up to 5.11d.
2019, Jim Reynolds, free solo.
2021, Sean Villanueva O’Driscoll completed the second ascent and first solo ascent of the "Fitz Traverse", completing the route in reverse.He received a Piolet d'Or award in 2022.
 2022, Colin Haley, first solo winter ascent of Supercanaleta route on Fitz Roy.

See also

 Villa O'Higgins
 Candelario Mancilla
 Del Desierto Lake
 Torres del Paine National Park
 Bernardo O'Higgins National Park
 Los Glaciares National Park
 Perito Moreno Glacier
 Cordillera del Paine
 O'Higgins/San Martín Lake

References

Further reading
 Kearney A, 1993. Mountaineering in Patagonia. Seattle, Washington: Cloudcap.
 Terray L, Conquistadors of the Useless, p. 307-8, Victor Gollancz Ltd., 1963.

External links

Andeshandbook: complete description, history, place name and routes of Fitz Roy
"Cerro Fitzroy, Argentina/Chile" on Peakbagger

Monte Fitz Roy in History 
Fitz Roy Summit Google Photo Sphere 3Feb2019

Mountains of Argentina
Mountains of Chile
Landforms of Santa Cruz Province, Argentina
Última Esperanza Province
Landforms of Magallanes Region
Argentina–Chile border
International mountains of South America
Three-thousanders of the Andes